Wedding Bills (also sometimes written as Wedding Bill$) is a 1927 American silent comedy film directed by Erle C. Kenton and starring Raymond Griffith, Anne Sheridan, and Hallam Cooley.

It is considered lost.

Cast

References

Bibliography
 Donald W. McCaffrey & Christopher P. Jacob. Guide to the Silent Years of American Cinema. Greenwood Publishing Group, 1999.

External links

1927 films
1927 comedy films
Silent American comedy films
Films directed by Erle C. Kenton
American silent feature films
1920s English-language films
Paramount Pictures films
American black-and-white films
1920s American films